Georges Jobé (6 January 1961 – 19 December 2012) was a Belgian professional motocross racer. He competed in the Motocross World Championships from 1979 to 1992. Jobé is notable for being a five-time FIM motocross world champion and a nine-time Belgian motocross national champion. He was named Belgian Sportsman of the year in 1987 and 1992.

Motocross career
Jobé was born in Retinne, Belgium. His older brother Claude Jobé competed in the motocross world championships for the Montesa factory racing team in the early 1970s. Jobé entered his first motocross race when he was 10-years-old. He won the 1977 250cc Belgian junior motocross championship riding a Montesa. 

In his first year of international competition, Jobé rode a Suzuki to a seventh place result in the 1979 250cc Motocross World Championship. In 1980, he became the youngest motocross world champion in history when he won the 1980 250cc motocross world championship at the age of 19. Jobé was a member of the victorious Belgian team at the 1980 Trophée des Nations and Motocross des Nations events.

Jobé led the 1981 250cc motocross world championship before a late season knee injury allowed Neil Hudson to overtake him by only two points in the final standings. The following season, he fought a season-long battle with Danny LaPorte but, once again finished second, 13 points behind LaPorte. In 1983, his rivalry with LaPorte continued with Jobé winning the 1983 250cc motocross world championship for Suzuki by a comfortable margin over his American rival.

Suzuki's decision to withdraw from the motocross world championships at the end of the 1983 season led Jobé to sign a contract to race for the Kawasaki factory racing team in the premier 500cc motocross world championship. The 1980s saw an elevated level of competition with multiple world champions such as Håkan Carlqvist, André Malherbe, David Thorpe and Eric Geboers facing off against Jobé for the 1984 500cc world championship. The 1984 500cc championship is prominent for featuring all three of the previous year's world champions – Carlqvist (500cc), Jobé (250cc) and Geboers (125cc). Jobé fought Malherbe and Geboers in a tight points battle before finishing the season in second place, just 11 points behind Malherbe.

Jobé accomplished one of the most audacious passes in motocross history during the 1984 500cc British Motocross Grand Prix, held at Hawkstone Park, Shropshire, England. In 1984, the Hawkstone Park circuit included a large "double jump" (before they were customary on top motocross circuits). Few riders had the courage to attempt to clear the jump during practice, let alone during the actual race. However, during the second race of the Grand Prix, Jobé passed rival André Malherbe by clearing the double jump, physically jumping over his rival in the process. Photographer Nick Haskell captured the moment, and the image of Jobé flying over Malherbe with spectators cheering in the background, is considered by motorsports journalists to be one of the most iconic images of Grand Prix motocross racing.

Jobé represented Belgium at the 1984 International Six Days Trial (ISDT) in Holland. The International Six Days Trial, now known as the International Six Days Enduro, is a form of off-road motorcycle Olympics which is the oldest annual competition sanctioned by the FIM dating back to 1913.

He dropped to fourth in the 1985 500cc motocross world championship behind the powerful factory Honda team of Thorpe, Malherbe and Geboers. The 1986 500cc World Championship was a repeat of the previous season with Jobé placing fourth behind the factory Honda trio but, the championship was one of the most dramatic in motocross history as, the top four riders finished the season with just 20 points separating them. Thorpe won the title with 316 points, while Jobe had 296 points.

Jobé dominated the 1987 500cc World Championship, winning the title by more than 50 points over second place Kurt Nicoll. Jobé's 1987 500cc championship was notable as he won riding a privateer Honda CR500. Most of his rivals were on the official works teams of Honda, Kawasaki or KTM. In 1988, having been crowned World Champion in the 500cc class, Jobé competed in the 125cc World Championship to attempt to win the "Triple Crown" (FIM 125, 250 and 500cc world titles). He was unsuccessful, with countryman Eric Geboers achieving the feat by winning the 500cc World championship in that same year (Geboers having previously won world 125 and 250cc titles). 

He suffered through two injury plagued seasons in 1989 and 1990 before winning two consecutive 500cc World Championships in 1991 and 1992 on Hondas, equalling fellow Belgian riders Roger De Coster and Eric Geboers with five World Motocross Championships apiece.

Later life
Jobé retired from competition after winning his fifth world championship in 1992. In 2006 he was signed by KTM to help start their racing program, coaching riders such as Mickaël Pichon, Sébastien Tortelli and Jonathan Barragán. In 2007 Jobé was coaching young riders in Dubai when he crashed and became paralyzed. After a period of rehabilitation, he was able to walk again however, in April 2011 he was diagnosed with leukemia. Jobé died from his illness in Brussels on 19 December 2012 at the age of 51.

Professional honours 
FIM World Motocross Champion
250cc 1980, 1983
500cc 1987, 1991, 1992

Belgian National Motocross Champion
250cc 1978,1980,1981,1982,1983
500cc 1984,1989

Italian National Motocross Champion
500cc 1986

FIM Trophee des Nations
1980, Member of Team Belgium

References 

1961 births
2012 deaths
People from Fléron
Belgian motocross riders
Deaths from leukemia
Deaths from cancer in Belgium
Sportspeople from Liège Province